alpha-Linolenic acid (ALA), also known as α-Linolenic acid (from Greek alpha meaning "first" and linon meaning flax), is an n−3, or omega-3, essential fatty acid. ALA is found in many seeds and oils, including flaxseed, walnuts, chia, hemp, and many common vegetable oils.

In terms of its structure, it is named all-cis-9,12,15-octadecatrienoic acid. In physiological literature, it is listed by its lipid number, 18:3, and (n−3). It is a carboxylic acid with an 18-carbon chain and three cis double bonds. The first double bond is located at the third carbon from the methyl end of the fatty acid chain, known as the n end. Thus, α-linolenic acid is a polyunsaturated n−3 (omega-3) fatty acid. It is an isomer of gamma-linolenic acid (GLA), an 18:3 (n−6) fatty acid (i.e., a polyunsaturated omega-6 fatty acid with three double bonds).

Etymology
The word linolenic is an irregular derivation from linoleic, which itself is derived from the Greek word linon (flax). Oleic means "of or relating to oleic acid" because saturating linoleic acid's omega-6 double bond produces oleic acid.

Dietary sources

Seed oils are the richest sources of α-linolenic acid, notably those of hempseed, chia, perilla, flaxseed (linseed oil), rapeseed (canola), and soybeans. α-Linolenic acid is also obtained from the thylakoid membranes in the leaves of Pisum sativum (pea leaves). Plant chloroplasts consisting of more than 95 percent of photosynthetic thylakoid membranes are highly fluid due to the large abundance of linolenic acid, that shows up as sharp resonances in high-resolution carbon-13 NMR spectra, invariably. Some studies state that ALA remains stable during processing and cooking. However, other studies state that ALA might not be suitable for baking, as it will polymerize with itself, a feature exploited in paint with transition metal catalysts. Some ALA may also oxidize at baking temperatures. ALA percentages in the table below refer to the oils extracted from each item.

Potential role in nutrition and health

Although the best source of ALA is seeds, most seeds and seed oils are much richer in an n−6 fatty acid, linoleic acid. Exceptions include flaxseed (must be ground for proper nutrient absorption) and chia seeds. Linoleic acid is the other essential fatty acid, but it, and the other n−6 fatty acids, compete with n−3s for positions in cell membranes and have very different effects on human health. There is a complex set of essential fatty acid interactions.

α-Linolenic acid can only be obtained by humans through their diets because the absence of the required 12- and 15-desaturase enzymes makes de novo synthesis from stearic acid impossible. Eicosapentaenoic acid (EPA; 20:5, n−3) and docosahexaenoic acid (DHA; 22:6, n−3) are readily available from fish and algae oil and play a vital role in many metabolic processes. These can also be synthesized by humans from dietary α-linolenic acid: ALA → stearidonic acid → eicosatetraeonic acid → eicosapentaenoic acid → docosapentaenoic acid → 9,12,15,18,21-tetracosapentaenoic acid → 6,9,12,15,18,21-tetracosahexaenoic acid → docosahexaenoic acid, but with an efficiency of only a few percent. 
Because the efficacy of n−3 long-chain polyunsaturated fatty acid (LC-PUFA) synthesis decreases down the cascade of α-linolenic acid conversion, DHA synthesis from α-linolenic acid is even more restricted than that of EPA. Conversion of ALA to DHA is higher in women than in men.

Stability and hydrogenation
Compared to many other oils, α-Linolenic acid is more susceptible to oxidation and will become rancid more quickly. Oxidative instability of α-linolenic acid is one reason why producers choose to partially hydrogenate oils containing α-linolenic acid, such as soybean oil. Soybeans are the largest source of edible oils in the U.S., and, as of a 2007 study, 40% of soy oil production was partially hydrogenated.

However, when partially hydrogenated, part of the unsaturated fatty acids become unhealthy trans fats. Consumers are increasingly avoiding products that contain trans fats, and governments have begun to ban trans fats in food products. These regulations and market pressures have spurred the development of low-α-linolenic acid soybeans. These new soybean varieties yield a more stable oil that doesn't require hydrogenation for many applications, thus providing trans fat-free products, such as frying oil.

Several consortia are bringing low-α-linolenic acid soy to market.  DuPont's effort involves silencing the FAD2 gene that codes for Δ6-desaturase, giving a soy oil with very low levels of both α-linolenic acid and linoleic acid. Monsanto Company has introduced to the market Vistive, their brand of low α-linolenic acid soybeans, which is less controversial than GMO offerings, as it was created via conventional breeding techniques.

Health

According to a 2012 review, higher ALA consumption is associated with a moderately lower risk of cardiovascular disease, but wide variation in results across multiple studies highlights the need for additional research before drawing firm conclusions.

Dietary ALA intake can improve lipid profiles by decreasing triglycerides, total cholesterol, high-density lipoprotein and low-density lipoprotein cholesterol. A 2021 review found that ALA intake is associated with a reduced risk of mortality from all causes, cardiovascular disease and coronary heart disease but a slightly higher risk of cancer mortality.

History
In 1887, linolenic acid was discovered and named by the Austrian chemist Karl Hazura of the Imperial Technical Institute at Vienna (although he didn't separate its isomers).  α-Linolenic acid was first isolated in pure form in 1909 by Ernst Erdmann and F. Bedford of the University of Halle an der Saale, Germany, and by Adolf Rollett of the Universität Berlin, Germany, working independently, as cited in J. W. McCutcheon's synthesis in 1942, and referred to in Green and Hilditch's 1930s survey. It was first artificially synthesized in 1995 from C6 homologating agents.  A Wittig reaction of the phosphonium salt of [(Z-Z)-nona-3,6-dien-1-yl]triphenylphosphonium bromide with methyl 9-oxononanoate, followed by saponification, completed the synthesis.

See also
Canola Oil
Flax Seed Oil
Gamma-Linolenic acid
Drying oil
Essential fatty acid
List of n−3 fatty acids
Essential nutrient
Wheat germ oil

References

5α-Reductase inhibitors
Fatty acids
Essential fatty acids
Essential nutrients
Alkenoic acids
Semiochemicals
Insect pheromones